Mictoschema is a genus of moths in the family Geometridae described by Prout in 1922.

Species
Mictoschema swierstrai Prout, 1922
Mictoschema tuckeri Prout, 1925

References

External links

Pseudoterpnini
Geometridae genera
Taxa named by Louis Beethoven Prout